Matute is a village in the province and autonomous community of La Rioja, Spain.

Matute may also refer to:

 Ana María Matute (1925–2014), Spanish writer
 Genoveva Matute (1915–2009), Filipino author
 José Lino Matute (1780–unknown), president of Honduras from 1838 until 1839
 Kelvin Matute (born 1988), Cameroonian footballer
 Oskar Matute (born 1972), Basque politician
 Roberto Matute (born 1972), Spanish footballer

See also
 Vegas de Matute, municipality in the province of Segovia, Castile and León, Spain